It Stains the Sands Red is a 2016 Canadian-American horror film directed by Colin Minihan. It stars Brittany Allen as a woman relentlessly pursued through the desert outside of Las Vegas by a single zombie.

Plot 
During a zombie apocalypse, Las Vegas residents Molly and Nick are on their way to meet up with some friends at a remote airfield in order to catch a plane ride out of the country. Their car gets stuck in the sand, and they encounter a lone zombie. After trying and failing to kill the zombie with his gun, Nick decides to wait for the zombie to lose interest in them, without success. The zombie kills Nick, and Molly continues across the desert on foot, all the while pursued by the slow-moving but persistent zombie.

Molly comes across an abandoned house, which she temporarily takes refuge in. The zombie follows her to the house, but she manages to evade it. After leaving the house, the zombie starts pursuing her again. She starts talking with the zombie, which she names "Smalls", and reveals that she was using Nick to get to Mexico. While traveling across the desert, she is knocked unconscious by a sandstorm.

After Molly regains consciousness, she encounters two men, Ted and Jason, who give her water to drink and help look for her bag, which she lost in the sandstorm. She becomes uncomfortable and decides to leave, but the two men threaten to kill her unless she gives them the location of the airfield she was heading to, which she does. Ted decides to rape Molly, but the zombie recovers and kills him, and Jason drives away.

While traveling to the airfield, Molly and Smalls encounter two soldiers. Molly unsuccessfully tries to hide Smalls from them, but they shoot the zombie. It bites Molly's finger, and she is forced to amputate it. Molly is forced to kill Smalls with a rock, as it is too weak to travel.

Molly makes it to the airfield, where she meets Jimmy, Nick's friend, and they prepare to travel to Mexico. Molly calls her sister Ali, but learns that her son Chase, who was living with Ali and her husband Blake, has been hiding in their house for several days. Molly decides to stay behind to rescue Chase, and finds the keys to a car in the airfield, killing several zombies along the way.

Molly makes it to the town where Chase lives and finds it deserted. Upon arriving at their house, she finds Ali and Blake dead, and finds Chase safe and unharmed. Several zombies break into the house, and Molly prepares to fight them off.

Cast  
 Brittany Allen as Molly
 Merwin Mondesir as Nick
 Juan Riedinger as Smalls
 Kristopher Higgins as Ted
 Andrew Supanz as Jason

Production 
Filming took place at Valley of Fire State Park in Nevada.

Release 
The film had its world premiere at the Sitges Film Festival in October 2016. It also screened at the 2017 LA Film Festival.

It began a limited theatrical release on July 28, 2017.

Critical reception 

Dennis Harvey of Variety praised Allen's performance, and wrote, "Watchable if never really scary or funny enough to leave a memorable impression, this middling endeavor should nonetheless pull in a fair number of home-viewing horror fans with its offbeat theme and lurid title." Rob Staeger of LA Weekly wrote, "what could have been a wordless slog is inventive and even buoyant".

John DeFore of The Hollywood Reporter wrote, "Genre fans will likely have a hard time coming to terms with this tonally confused and sometimes grating film, whose commercial prospects are limited despite the appeals it makes to some underserved audiences".

References

External links
 

2016 films
2016 horror films
American zombie films
Films set in deserts
Films set in the Las Vegas Valley
2010s English-language films
2010s American films